"My Racing Thoughts" is the first studio single from the album People and Things by Jack's Mannequin. It was made available as a digital single on iTunes and Amazon on August 2, 2011.

Music video
An official video was released for "My Racing Thoughts" on September 30, 2011, along with 10 other videos, with a video for each of the 11 songs on People and Things. The video for My Racing Thoughts was directed by Anders Rostad.

Personnel
"My Racing Thoughts" personnel adapted from the CD liner notes

Jack's Mannequin
Andrew McMahon – Vocals, Piano, Percussion, Keyboards
Bobby "Raw" Anderson – Guitar, Background vocals
Jay McMillan – Drums, Percussion
Tim Pierce - Guitars
Jamie Muhoberac - Keyboards, B3
Chris Chaney - Bass
Patrick Warren - Keyboards
Production
Nigel Lundemo - Pro Tools Engineering
Ted Jenson - Mastering at Sterling Sound
Steve Rea and Russ Waugh - Assistant Engineers
Chris Lord-Alge - Mixing at Mix LA
Cheryl Jenets - Production Manager
Art
Patrick Conception - Illustrations
Conception Studios - Art Direction
Music Video
Anders Rostad - Music Video Director
Dylan VanDam - Music Video Producer
Jesse Springer - Music Video Director of Photography

References

2011 singles
Jack's Mannequin songs
2011 songs
Sire Records singles